Mika Aaltola (born 1969) is a Finnish political scientist and director of the Finnish Institute of International Affairs. He has gained media attention during the 2022 Russian invasion of Ukraine, which he follows and regularly comments on. Aaltola holds a doctorate in social sciences. He works as docent at Tampere University, and is a part-time professor at Tallinn University.

His sister is philosopher Elisa Aaltola.

Biography

Aaltola was born in 1969 in Petäjävesi, Central Finland. He completed a Bachelor of Arts in Psychology at Columbia University in New York City. Aaltola then moved Tampere, took up political science, and got his doctorate in 1999.

In 2019, he published the book  about international politics since the beginning of the Russo-Ukrainian war in 2014. The same year, Aaltola was elected director of the Finnish Institute of International Affairs, where he had been working since 2011 as leader of the research project on global security.

Aaltola was named Tampere University alumnus of the year in September 2022. In October, he released the book , a collection of his notes and texts from June 2021 to July 2022.

Owing to his high profile during the Russian invasion of Ukraine, Aaltola rose to the peak position of an October 2022 poll in anticipation of the presidential elections in 2024. Aaltola responded that he found it unlikely he would become president, but that if he ran, he would do so as an independent.

References

1969 births
Living people
Finnish political scientists
Academic staff of Tallinn University
Columbia University alumni
University of Tampere alumni
People from Petäjävesi